For the 2005–06 season, Carlisle United Football Club competed in Football League Two.

Results and fixtures

English League Two

English League Cup

FA Cup

Football League Trophy

References
 11v11

Carlisle United F.C. seasons
Carlisle United